Philip Ardagh's Book of Kings, Queens, Emperors and Rotten Wart-Nosed Commoners is a children's history book.

2011 children's books
British children's books
Children's history books